Rasmus Karjalainen (born 4 April 1996) is a Finnish professional footballer who plays as a winger for AC Oulu and represents the Finland national football team. He began his senior career in 2014, at age 18, with OLS.

Karjalainen made his international debut for Finland in June 2018, and has since appeared in 2018–19 UEFA Nations League and in Finland's UEFA Euro 2020 campaign, in which Finland national team secured its first ever place in European Football Championship tournament's group stage.

Club career

OLS

Karjalainen made his debut on senior level on 3 May 2014 in the ranks of OLS in a Kakkonen match against PS Kemi.

SJK Akatemia

For the next season he transferred to SJK's reserve team SJK Akatemia. During the season he gained 27 caps and 15 goals and was the second best goal scorer of the league.

Oulu

He spent season 2016 in his home town Oulu playing for AC Oulu.

PS Kemi

Karjalainen made his debut on the highest level of Finnish football, Veikkausliiga on season 2017 when he transferred to PS Kemi. He made his debut on 8 April, playing the first 70 minutes of a 0–0 draw against HIFK.

KuPS

For season 2018 he signed for KuPS.

Fortuna Sittard

In June 2019 he made a deal with Dutch Fortuna Sittard.

In August 2020 he was loaned for a year to Allsvenskan side Örebro.

Helsingborg

On 17 July 2021, Karjalainen joined Superettan club Helsingborgs IF, signing a two-year deal.

Return to Oulu
On 23 June 2022, Karjalainen returned to AC Oulu.

International career

Karjalainen made his debut for the Finland national team on 5 June 2018 in a friendly match in Ilie Oană Stadium, Ploiești against Romania when he replaced Berat Sadik as a substitute on 63rd minute.

Career statistics

International

.

International goals

Scores and results list Finland's goal tally first.

Honours

KuPS
Veikkausliiga: 2019
Individual
Veikkausliiga Team of the Year: 2017

References

External links

 Fortuna Sittard official profile
 Rasmus Karjalainen – SPL competition record
 
 

1996 births
Living people
Finnish footballers
Finland international footballers
Finland under-21 international footballers
Finland youth international footballers
Association football midfielders
AC Oulu players
Kemi City F.C. players
Kuopion Palloseura players
Veikkausliiga players
SJK Akatemia players
Oulun Luistinseura players
Eredivisie players
Fortuna Sittard players
Allsvenskan players
Superettan players
Örebro SK players
Helsingborgs IF players
Finnish expatriate footballers
Expatriate footballers in the Netherlands
Finnish expatriate sportspeople in the Netherlands
Expatriate footballers in Sweden
Finnish expatriate sportspeople in Sweden
Sportspeople from Oulu